The Protection Against Harassment of Women at the Workplace Act, 2010 is a legislative act in Pakistan that seeks to protect women from sexual harassment at their place of work. The Acts of Majlis-e-Shoora (Parliament) received the assent of the President on 9 March, 2010. The objective was to "create a safe working environment for women, which is free of harassment, abuse and intimidation with a view toward fulfillment of their right to work with dignity."

Background 
Prior to the Act, sexual harassment had never been defined in Pakistan through legislative instrument, nor was there a clear definition of harassment, whether in public, private or workplaces.

Implementation 
The majority of Pakistan's working female population works without a contract. Over 60% of Pakistan's informal labor sector is not protected by this law, as they work without a contract.

Amendments 
The Act has been amended multiple times. 

An amendment, Protection Against Harassment of Women at the Workplace (Amendment) Act, 2014, was introduced in the senate on 20 January 2014.

See also 
 Women related laws in Pakistan
Aurat March

References 

Violence against women in Pakistan
Gender equality
Women's rights legislation
Pakistani criminal law
2010 in women's history